Beulah High School is a public  high school located in Beulah, North Dakota. It currently serves 200 students and is a part of the Beulah Public Schools system. The official school colors are blue and gold and the athletic teams are known as the Miners.

Athletics

Championships
State class "B" baseball: 1956, 2012 
State class "B" football: 1989, 2015 
State Class 'B' boys' track and field: 1986, 1987, 1988, 1989, 1990 
State Class 'B' girls' track and field: 1987, 1988 
State Class 'B' volleyball: 1989, 1995, 1996 
State Class 'B' basketball: 2012

References

External links
 Beulah High School

Public high schools in North Dakota
North Dakota High School Activities Association (Class B)
North Dakota High School Activities Association (Class AA Football)
Schools in Mercer County, North Dakota